This is a list of the main career statistics of tennis player Jennifer Capriati.

Major finals

Grand Slam finals

Singles: 3 (3 titles)

Olympic finals

Singles: 1 (1 title)

Tier I finals

Singles: 11 (2 titles, 9 runners-up)

Doubles: 1 (1 title)

WTA Tour finals

Singles (14 titles, 17 runners-up)

Doubles (1–1)

Additional finals

Fed Cup finals (2–1)

Grand Slam girls' singles finals (2–0)

Grand Slam girls' doubles finals (2–0)

Grand Slam singles performance timeline

WTA Tour career earnings

Career Grand Slam seedings

Grand Slam titles details

Record against top 10 players
Capriati's record against players who have been ranked in the top 10:

External links 
 
 
 

Capriati, Jennifer